Jarlis Ariel Mosquera (born September 3, 1983 in Palmira, Valle del Cauca) is a Colombian freestyle wrestler. He represented Colombia at the 2008 Summer Olympics in Beijing, where he qualified for the men's under-84 kg category (light heavyweight division). Mosquera was eliminate in the first preliminary round of the competition, after being defeated by Ukraine's Taras Danko, without receiving a technical score for the entire period.

Mosquera also won the silver medal for the same category at the 2010 Central American and Caribbean Games in Mayagüez, Puerto Rico, losing out to the host nation's Jaime Espinal in the final match.

References

External links 
NBC 2008 Olympics profile
 

1983 births
Living people
Wrestlers at the 2008 Summer Olympics
Olympic wrestlers of Colombia
Colombian male sport wrestlers
People from Palmira, Valle del Cauca
Central American and Caribbean Games silver medalists for Colombia
Competitors at the 2010 Central American and Caribbean Games
Central American and Caribbean Games medalists in wrestling
Sportspeople from Valle del Cauca Department
20th-century Colombian people
21st-century Colombian people